Systoechus vulgaris, the grasshopper bee fly, is a species of bee fly in the family Bombyliidae. Its larvae are predators of grasshopper eggs.

References

Bombyliidae
Articles created by Qbugbot
Insects described in 1863